Saâdane Afif (born 1970 in Vendôme, Loir-et-Cher Département, France) is a French conceptual artist.

Life and career 
Saâdane Afif graduated from the School of Fine Arts in Bourges and later received his 1998 postgraduate degree from the School of Fine Arts in Nantesat (École des Beaux Arts). In 2001, he was in residence at the "Villa Arson" International Art School of Nice (France); in 2002, he was in residence at the Villa Médicis in Glasgow (Scotland). In 2003, he moved to Berlin, where he currently lives and works. Afif's work has been exhibited at many venues, including the Museum Folkwang (Essen, Germany) in 2004. In 2006, he was awarded the International Prize for Contemporary Art of the Fondation Prince Pierre de Monaco at the Centre Pompidou in Paris. In 2009, he received the Marcel Duchamp Prize; as a result of winning this prize, he presented his artwork in the exhibition "Anthology of black humour" at Space 315, Centre Pompidou, Paris from September 2010 until January 2011. In 2011, he was the 46th most influential person in the French art world, according to the March issue of Eye Magazine. Saâdane Afif lives and works in Berlin.

Art 
Defined as ‘post-conceptual’, Saâdane Afif’s work focuses on interpretation, exchange and circulation. He works in various media (performance, objects, sculptures, text, posters and works in neon). The complex procedures he uses are not categorised under any specific discipline. All of his works are subject to a continuous process of alteration. He integrates elements of art history, music, poetry and dance into his work, sometimes inviting authors to write texts based on existing artworks for other artists to set to music or use in drama. Afif himself refuses to appear in public, preferring to direct from afar.

In 2008, Afif began a project entitled the Fountain Archive. This currently contains about 500 images of Duchamp’s porcelain urinal. In this project, Afif collects and archives every single publication in which he finds a reproduction of Duchamp's urinal. As a found object, every page containing a picture of the urinal is torn out and then carefully framed. The frame, used both for its preservative and decorative purposes, is also part of the artistic process. Every step of the archiving process follows meticulous rules which form a part of this artistic process. Each new archived image has its own inventory card, which acts as a certificate of authenticity. Publications which discuss Afif's project (and therefore reproduce images of Duchamp's urinal) are also included in the Fountain Archive project: these, though, are treated as special objects as they constitute a historical echo of the original work. This is the only exception to the generally strict rule that each photograph can only be included in the Fountain Archive once.

In April 2012, an exhibition took place at the Museum für Moderne Kunst in Frankfurt. The MMK Zollamt was an exhibition outside the main exhibition space, presenting Saâdane Afif's "Anthologie de l’humour noir". It highlighted some aspects of African influence in a new and unusual light, since this was also connected to modern French art and literature. The centrepiece was a coffin made in Ghana which plays an ode to the deceased. The shape of the coffin is a reference to the Centre Pompidou and it was titled Humour Noir (a translation of "black humour"). This phrase was made famous by André Breton.

Exhibitions 
 2018: Saâdane Afif. This is Ornamental, Kunsthalle Wien, Vienna, Austria
 2018: Paroles, Wiels Contemporary Art Center, Brussels, Belgium
 2017: Saâdane Afif: Fontaines, Publications, disques & Multiples, CLA Rennes, Rennes, France
 2017: GOODS, Galerie Mehdi Chouakri, Berlin, Germany
 2017: Ici., Leopold-Hoesch Museum, Düren, Germany
 2017: Là-bas., La Panacée, Montpellier, France
 2017: The Fairytale Recordings, Frac Franche-Comté, Besançon, France
 2017: The Fountain Archives 2008–2017, Centre Pompidou, Paris, France, travelled to Nouveau Musée National de Monaco, Monaco
 2016: Quoi ? - L’Eternité, Fondation d’entreprise Hermès, Atelier Hermès, Seoul, Korea
 2015: The End of the World, Museum für Naturkunde, Berlin, Germany
 2014: Ici, Günther-Peill-Stiftung am Leopold-Hoesch-Museum & Papiermuseum Düren, Düren, Germany
 2014: Affiches & Fontaines, Gallery Xavier Hufkens, Brussels, Belgium
 2013: Sept notes sur le travail des Peter Roehr (with Peter Roehr), Gallery Mehdi Chouakri, Berlin, Germany
 2012: Anthologie de l’humour noir, Museum für Moderne Kunst - MMK Zollamt, Frankfurt, Germany
 2011: The Fairytale Recordings, Schinkel Pavillon, Berlin, Germany
 2011: The Fairytale Recordings, RaebervonStenglin, Zurich, Switzerland
 2010: Saâdane Afif – Anthologie de l’humour noir, Centre Pompidou, Paris, France
 2009: Varieté, Gallery Mehdi Chouakri, Berlin, Germany
 2007: Documenta 12, Kassel, Germany
 2008: ONE, FRAC Fonds Régional d'Art Contemporain Pays de la Loire, Carquefou, France
 2008: TWO..., FRAC Fonds Régional d'Art Contemporain Basse-Normandie, Caen, France
 2006: Power Chords, Fondation Prince Pierre de Monaco, Monaco, Monaco
 2005: Lyrics, Palais de Tokyo, Paris, France
 2004: Melancholic Beat, Museum Folkwang, Essen, Germany

Awards and grants 
 2015: Prix Meurice pour l'art contemporain, Paris, France 
 2012: Prize of Günther-Peill-Stiftung, Germany
 2009: Prix Marcel Duchamp, Paris, France
 2006: Prix International d’Art Contemporain de la Fondation Prince Pierre de Monaco, Monaco
 2002: Award of Villa Medicis Hors les Murs (Residence) in Glasgow, Scotland
 2001: Scholarship (Residence), Villa Arson, Nice, France

Bibliography 
 Eva Huttenlauch: „Everything must be scandalous“, in: Saâdane Afif. Another Anthology of Black Humor, published by Susanne Gaensheimer and Eva Huttenlauch, Verlag für Moderne Kunst, Nürnberg 2012.
 Elena Filipovic, Xavier Hufkens: Sâadane Afif. Fontaines. Triangle Books, 2014, .
 Valentina Vlasic: Saâdane Afif, in: The Present Order is the Disorder of the Future, Schriftenreihe Museum Kurhaus Kleve – Ewald Mataré-Sammlung Nr. 62, Freundeskreis Museum Kurhaus und Koekkoek-Haus Kleve e.V. (Hrsg), 2013, p. 57.

External links 
 The Fountain Archives
 Exhibitions of Saâdane Afif
 Biography of Saâdane Afif
 Saâdane Afif Artist Page at Sommer Contemporary Art Gallery Website.
 Saâdane Afif at Gallery Mehdi Chouakri
 Saâdane Afif at Gallery Raebervon Stenglin
 Saâdane Afif at Gallery Xavier Hufkens

References 

1970 births
People from Vendôme
French contemporary artists
Living people